Sho Sasaki may refer to:
Sho Sasaki (born 1982), Japanese former badminton player
Sho Sasaki (footballer) (born 1989), Japanese footballer

See also
5395 Shosasaki, a minor planet named for University of Tokyo professor Sho Sasaki